Nduga is a Papuan language of the Indonesian New Guinea Highlands province of Highland Papua.

References

Dani languages
Languages of western New Guinea